The Cavan Junior Football Championship is an annual Gaelic Athletic Association club competition between the third-tier Cavan Gaelic football clubs. It was first competed for in 1913. The winner qualifies to represent their county in the Ulster Club Championship and in turn, go on to the All-Ireland Junior Club Football Championship. The current champions are Laragh United, who defeated Mountnugent in the 2012 decider on a scoreline of 0–10 to 2–03.

Format
10 teams will contest the Hotel Kilmore Junior Championship in 2013.

Teams have been drawn into 3 groups, one 4 team (Group 1) and two 3 teams, (Group 2 & 3). The group stages will be played on a league basis. Where teams finish on equal points group placings will be decided in accordance with rule 6.20 of the GAA Official Guide 2013.

The top team in each group will qualify for the semi-finals. The runner up in group 2 and 3 will play off (Round 4(a)), with the winner qualifying to play in a further play off against the runner up in group 1 (Round 4(b)). The winner of this play off will qualify for the semi-final.

Semi-final pairings will be based on an open draw.

2013 Championship

Group A

Group B

Group C

Semi Final play-offs

Semi finals

Final

References

External links
 Cavan at ClubGAA
 Official Cavan GAA Website

Cavan Junior Football Championship
Cavan GAA Football championships